Les Infidèles is a French rock band, established in the early 1990s, disestablished in 1997 and reformed in 2007.

History
The group was founded in Lons-le-Saunier (Jura, France). They published four albums from 1990 to 1997, and released fours singles. One of their songs, "Les Larmes des maux", was a hit in France, staying on the chart for 23 weeks. In 2007, after ten years of absence, they released a CD maxi named "Cirkus".

Members
 Jean Rigo : guitar, vocals
 Olivier Derudet, replaced by Jean-Cyril Masson in 1997 : bass
 Jo Matiss : drums
 Annette Bailly, replaced by Fabrice Ragris in 1991 : keyboards

Discography

Albums
 Rebelle (1990)
 Héritage (1993)
 Human Way of Life (1995)
 Ailleurs (1997)
 Turbulences (2010)

Singles
 "Rebelle" (1990) - #27 in France
 "Les Larmes des maux" (1992) - #9 in France
 "Comme une chatte" (1993)
 "Cirkus" (2007)

References

French rock music groups
Musical groups established in 1990
Musical groups from Bourgogne-Franche-Comté